Obowo, also spelled Obowu  is a Local Government Area in Imo State, Nigeria formed during the Ibrahim Babangida administration in May 1989. It was carved out of Etiti Local Government Area with its headquarters at Isi Nweke. There are twenty-two autonomous communities in Obowo Local Government Area. Achara, Amanze, Umuariam, Umunachi,  Umuagu, Ehume, Umungwa, Umulogho, Odenkwume, Okwuohia, Amuzi, Alike, Avutu, Umuosochie and Umuoke are towns in the L.G.A. Obowo is located about 45 minutes from Owerri, across the Imo River and is less than 30 minutes from the Umuahia and Ahiara in opposite directions with the Amanze seven and a half (71/2) junction and landmark in-between. It is surrounded by Ahiazu and Aboh Mbaise Local Government Areas to the north and Umuahia Abia State to the East.

The people of Obowo Local Government Area are known for farming and fishing and they produce palm oil, kernel, local baskets, brooms and rice. They are also known for politics and as a result, the Local Government Area produced the first executive Governor of Imo State in the person of late Sam Mbakwe. Other prominent politicians in Obowo Local Government Area include Chris Okewulaonu, Chike Okafor, Dr Goderick Anosike, Sylvester Anyanwu, Longinus Anyanwu, Charles Ugwu, Celestine Ngobiwu, Fabian Ihekweme, Kennedy Ibe and Ike C. Ibe.

A cultural festival known as "Iwa Akwa Festival" exists in Obowo Local Government Area. Other festivals in the area include Ekpo, Mbomuzo and Egbe-Nkwu. There are also some tourist attraction centers in Obowo Local Government Area. They include the Green Coloured Abadaba Lake which is situated at Okwuohia Autonomous Community, Iyi-Ukwu and the Umuariam Game Reserve Center with live monkeys.

The Local Government 

The Obowo Local Government Council was formed by the defunct Ibrahim Babangida Administration during the creation of Local Governments in Nigeria in May 1989. It was formerly a part of the Local Government Etiti headquartered in Isi-Nweke. It is home to about twenty-two autonomous communities.

Economy 
Formerly based around farming and fishing, the economy of Obowo now includes areas of industrial services, ranging from manufacturing to communications. Obowo people produce a large quantity of palm oil, kernel, local baskets, brooms, and rice.

Politics 
The people are politically active. The first Executive Governor of Imo State, Chief Samuel Onunaka Mbakwe, was born in Nigeria. Other prominent politicians from Obowo include Christ Okewulaonu, Chike Okafor, Sylvester Anyanwu, Longinus Anyanwu, Charles Ugwu, Goderick Anosike, Chika Okafor, Celestine Ngobiwu B.U Nwoko, Kennedy Ibeh, Ike C. Ibe and Chike Okafor who is the current house of representative member. Also the LGA has produced a lot of academicians and notable citizens that rose to the pinacle of their career, although they are too numerous to mention but a couple of them are Prof B.B Nwoke, Prof Mrs Anyanwu, Prof Columba Nwoke, Engr Philip Chukwu, Engr Godwin Chukwu, Engr Celestine Uche Nwokorie, DCP C Amaechi, DCP Innocent Brown, DCP  Ihechere, ACP Albert M. Okechukwu, Bri General Okechukwu Nkem.

Culture and Tourism 
Obowo have a very rich cultural festival, the Iwa-Akwa Festival, which embraces the general Obowo citizen. Other festivals include, Ekpo, Mbomuzo, Egbe-Nkwu. Popular tourist attractions in the area are Green Coloured Abadaba Lake which is located in Okwuohia Automous Community, Iyi-Ukwu, and the Umuariam Game Reserve Centre with live monkeys.

References

Local Government Areas in Imo State
Local Government Areas in Igboland
Towns in Imo State